Captain Paul Delano (June 15, 1775 – February 4, 1842) was an American born sea captain and a member of the prominent American Delano family.

Early life
Delano was born in Fairhaven, Massachusetts on June 15, 1775, to Nathan Pope Delano and Sarah (née Tripp) Delano.

A descendant of Philip Delano, Paul's paternal grandparents Jethro Delano and Elizabeth (née Pope) Delano. His grandfather Jethro's younger brother, Thomas Delano, was himself the grandfather of Warren Delano Sr. (the father of Franklin Hughes Delano and Warren Delano Jr., as well as a grandfather of Warren Delano IV, Frederic Adrian Delano, and Sara Delano Roosevelt, the mother of U.S. President Franklin Delano Roosevelt).

Career
He moved to Chile as Captain of the Curiacio where he arrived on June 22, 1819, and became an important part of that country's First Chilean Navy Squadron. He came with his two sons, Paul H., and William.

Paul Delano was commissioned as a captain and commanded sixteen troop means of transport of the Freedom Expedition of Perú and later he commanded the Lautaro.

In 1822, he became Captain of the port of Valparaíso where he directed the building of the first wharf and the first lighthouse of the port in 1837.

Personal life
Delano was married to Ann Ferguson Hinckley.  Together, they were the parents of:

 Paul Hinckley Delano (1806–1881), who became Lord Admiral Thomas Cochrane's personal aide and, at fourteen years of age, was given command of one of the boarding parties during the capture of the Esmeralda (1791) in the port of Callao on 5 November 1820.

Delano died on February 4, 1842, in Talcahuano, Chile.

See also
 First Chilean Navy Squadron
 Chilean frigate Independencia (1818)
 Freedom Expedition of Perú

References

External links
 Delano website

1775 births
1842 deaths
Paul
American emigrants to Chile
People from Fairhaven, Massachusetts
Military personnel from Massachusetts
Chilean Navy personnel of the Spanish American wars of independence